Oirata is a genus of moths in the family Pterophoridae.

Species
Oirata nivella (Ustjuzhanin, 2001)
Oirata poculidactyla (K. Nupponen & T. Nupponen, 2001)
Oirata taklamakanus (Arenberger, 1995)

Pterophorini
Moth genera